Untvad is a village near the Taluka headquarters Babra in Amreli district of Gujarat in the country of India. It is situated to the west of Babra and to the north of Amreli. The main road linking Chavand - Babra - Kotdapitha passes through Untvad. Bhurakhiya Hanuman Mandir Khodiyar Mandir are the major attractions accessible from here. Rajkot Airport and Lathi Railway Station serve Untvad.

References

Villages in Amreli district